Édouard Léon Théodore Mesens (27 November 1903 – 13 May 1971) was a Belgian artist and writer associated with the Belgian Surrealist movement.

Biography
Mesens was born in Brussels, Belgium. He started his artistic career as a musician influenced by Erik Satie and an author of dadaist poems. He was a publisher of the books Œesophage and Mariewith his lifetime friend and soulmate René Magritte. His activity as one of the leaders of the surrealist movement in Belgium was eased by him being an owner of a gallery, where he organised the first surrealist exhibition in Belgium in 1934. He also went to co-organise the London International Surrealist Exhibition, which made him settle in London. There he became the director of the London Gallery (which he ran during the late 1930s and after the war with Roland Penrose) and the chief editor of the London Bulletin (1938–1940), which was one of the most important bulletins among the English-language Surrealist periodicals.

Mesens died in 1971 following a "long, lingering, painful illness". According to an obituary published by poet and historian Franklin Rosemont, Mesens committed "suicide by absinthe", drinking himself to death by wilfully disregarding doctors' orders to abstain from alcohol.

Works
 Alphabet sourd aveugle - Flamel, Brussels - with preface and a note by Paul Éluard (1933)
 Troisième Front - London Gallery Editions (1944)
 Free Unions - Unions Libres - Directed by Simon Watson Taylor (1946)
 The Cubist Spirit in Its Time - London Gallery Editions - with Robert Melville (1947)
 Poèmes, 1923–1958 - Le Terrain Vague (1959)

References

Further reading
 George Melly: Don't Tell Sybil: An Intimate Memoir of E. L. T. Mesens (1997).

External links
 Tate Collection - Four works by ELT Mesens
 Inventory of the E. L. T. Mesens papers - at the Getty Research Institute

1903 births
1971 deaths
Belgian artists
Belgian surrealist writers
Belgian writers in French
1971 suicides
Belgian expatriates in the United Kingdom
Belgian art dealers
British art dealers